The Boys who Challenged Hitler: Knud Pedersen and the Churchill Club is a 2015 non-fiction book written by Phillip Hoose. The book recaps the story of the Danish Resistance group during World War II, the Churchill Club, and its leader and founder, Knud Pedersen. The group's rebellious acts not only infuriated the Germans but also sparked a Danish rebellion, releasing the boys from their temporary captivity.

References

2015 non-fiction books
History books about Denmark
Books about World War II
Farrar, Straus and Giroux books